Indonesian singer Isyana Sarasvati has received many awards. These include awards as a classical and a pop singer. She started her career through her debut single in 2014 entitled "Keep Being You" which won her the Best Male/Female R&B/Soul/Urban Solo Artist award at the Anugerah Musik Indonesia 2015. Her hit single "Tetap Dalam Jiwa" won her the Best of the Best Newcomer award in the same event. Sarasvati won an international award at the Mnet Asian Music Awards as Best Asian Artist Indonesia in 2016. The following year she won a trophy for the professional category, Composer of the Year and 2 awards in Anugerah Planet Muzik. In 2017 Sarasvati represented Indonesia at the MTV Europe Music Awards for the Best South East Asia Act category.

In 2016 she received an award by the Ministry of Law and Human Rights for her work on copyright and related rights. She was included in the 30 under 30 Forbes Indonesia list in the art, style & entertainment category. In April 2020, Sarasvati made the 30 under 30 Forbes Asia list in the Entertainment & Sports category and in the (special) Celebrities category.

Awards and nominations

Other awards and honours 

 Other award lists are written for awards that do not have a nomination list and only the winners are announced. Including those in the form of listicle.

Classical Awards

Vocal (Soprano)
International & National

 2014 Awarded the "RCM Excellence Award (Degree)" Scholarship
 2013 1st Winner (Grand Prize) Tembang Puitik Ananda Sukarlan National Vocal Competition (Surabaya, Indonesia)
 2013 Awarded the "NAFA Entry Scholarship (Degree)" (Full Scholarship)
 2013 Gold Certificate, 5th Bangkok Opera Foundation Singing Competition (Bangkok, Thailand)
 2012 First Prize, 6th Tan Ngiang Kaw/Tan Ngiang Ann Memorial Vocal Competition (Singapore)
 2010 Tuition Grant from Singapore MOE for Diploma Study at NAFA

Electone
International

 2012 Semi-finalist Yamaha Electone Electone Concours 2011 – Open Age Section (Tokyo, Japan) Yamaha Music Scholarship in Asia (Singapore)
 2011 Grand Prize, Asia Pacific Electone Festival 2011 – Open Age Section (Singapore)
 2009 Yamaha Music Scholarship in Asia 2009 (Indonesia)
 2008 International Junior Original Concert (IJOC) – Top 12 best compositions (Tokyo, Japan)
 2008 Third Prize, Asia Electone Festival (AEF) 2008 – Junior Section (Indonesia)
 2005 Grand Prize, Asia Electone Festival (AEF) 2005 – Junior Section (Indonesia)

National

 2011 Grand Prix Award, Yamaha Electone Festival 2011 – Open Age Section (Singapore)
 2009 Second Prize, National Yamaha Electone Festival 2009 (Jakarta, Indonesia) Grand Prix Award, Yamaha Electone Festival 2009 – Open Section (Bandung, Indonesia)
 2008 Grand Prize, National Yamaha Electone Festival 2008, Junior Section (Surabaya, Indonesia)
 2005 Second Prize, National Yamaha Electone Festival 2005 – Junior Section (Jakarta, Indonesia)

Piano
National & Regional

 2010 Finalist, Yamaha Piano Competition Indonesia (Jakarta, Indonesia)
 2010 First prize, Yamaha Piano Competition West Java Regional (Bandung, Indonesia)
 2009 First Prize, Piano Competition Pianist Bandung (Bandung, Indonesia)
 2008 Participant, UPH Chopin Piano Competition (Jakarta, Indonesia)
 2007 Finalist, Yamaha Piano Competition Indonesia (Jakarta, Indonesia) First prize, Piano Competition West Java Regional (Indonesia)

References 

 

Isyana Sarasvati
Anugerah Musik Indonesia winners
MAMA Award winners